Augustana Vikings may refer to:
 Augustana University Vikings, the sports teams of Augustana University in Sioux Falls, South Dakota
 Augustana (Illinois) Vikings, the sports teams of Augustana College in Rock Island, Illinois
 The sports teams of Augustana University College in Alberta, Canada